The Pure & Simple Tour is the twelfth and final headlining concert tour by American country music artist, Dolly Parton. The tour supports the singer's 43rd studio album, Pure & Simple. It is marketed as Parton's biggest tour in North America, with over sixty shows planned for 2016. The tour began on June 3, 2016 in Greensboro, North Carolina and concluded on December 10 2016 in Thackerville, Oklahoma.

Background
The tour was announced March 6, 2016 on Parton's official website. A press conference was held the following day providing additional details concerning the tour. The trek is coined as Parton's biggest tour in 25 years. 64 dates are planned in the United States and Canada, visiting the most requested markets missed on previous tours. Alongside the tour; the singer's latest album, Pure & Simple was released worldwide on August 19. Parton explained a tour was not planned due to her busy schedule. In August 2015, the singer performed two sold-out shows at the Ryman Auditorium in Nashville. The scaled down shows sparked Parton's interest in returning to the stage.

Previous tours saw a majority of shows in Europe and Australia. Parton states her lack of hits in the U.S. for the past 20 years pushed focus on other territories. With this tour, Parton will move away from her typical big productions and perform a minimalist show in an intimate setting. This will allow the singer to perform in venues of all sizes. The show will feature songs with an acoustic sound, few interludes and more interaction with the audience.

To further describe the show, Parton stated: "We're so excited to get out there and see the fans again. I'm really looking forward to singing songs the fans have not heard in a while, as well as the hits, while debuting a few new ones off Pure & Simple"

Setlist
The following songs were performed during the June 4, 2016 concert at the Infinite Energy Arena in Duluth, GA. It does not represent all concerts during the tour.

"Train, Train"
"Pure & Simple"
"Why'd You Come in Here Lookin' Like That?"
"Jolene"
"Precious Memories"
"My Tennessee Mountain Home"
"Coat of Many Colors"
"Smoky Mountain Memories"
"Applejack"
"Rocky Top"
"Banks of the Ohio"
"American Pie" / "If I Had a Hammer"
"Blowin' in the Wind"
"The Night They Drove Old Dixie Down"
"The Seeker"
"I'll Fly Away"
Intermission
 "Baby I'm Burning" / "Great Balls of Fire" / "Girl on Fire"
"Outside Your Door"
"The Grass Is Blue"
"Those Memories of You"
"Do I Ever Cross Your Mind?"
"Little Sparrow"
"Two Doors Down"
"Here You Come Again"
"Islands in the Stream"
"9 to 5"
Encore
"I Will Always Love You"
"Hello God" / "He's Alive"

Tour dates

Festivals and other miscellaneous performances
Ohio State Fair
Ravinia Festival

Cancellations and rescheduled shows

References

2016 concert tours
2017 concert tours
Dolly Parton concert tours